Ganzhou–Shenzhen high-speed railway, or Ganzhou–Shenzhen section of Beijing–Hong Kong corridor, is a high-speed railway from Shenzhen and the Pearl River Delta through northeast Guangdong province to Ganzhou in Jiangxi province. It will form part of Beijing–Hong Kong corridor. The railway opened on 10 December 2021.

History
Guangdong officials listed the Ganzhou–Shenzhen HSR as a major part of the province's 2011 agenda, and Shenzhen Mayor Xu Qin called for accelerated construction of the line at the provincial legislature's annual session in 2012. Peng Jianwen, mayor of the city of Heyuan in northwestern Guangdong, confirmed in January 2014 that construction of the Ganzhou-Shenzhen HSR will start in 2015 and be completed in 2020.

Tracklaying began on 1 February 2021.

Stations

References

High-speed rail in China
Railway lines opened in 2021